KYON-LP (97.7 FM) was a low-power radio station broadcasting a religious format. Licensed to Canyonville, Oregon, United States, the station was owned by Canyonville Christian Academy.

The station went silent on April 4, 2012 due to an equipment crash. The licensee never restored service and ultimately surrendered KYON-LP's license to the Federal Communications Commission (FCC) on October 29, 2013. The FCC cancelled the station's license on October 30, 2013.

References

External links
 

YON-LP
YON-LP
Douglas County, Oregon
Canyonville, Oregon
Radio stations disestablished in 2013
Defunct radio stations in the United States
Defunct religious radio stations in the United States
2013 disestablishments in Oregon
YON-LP